Fun and Games is an album by the Huntingtons released in 1997 on Flying Tart Records.

Track listing
All songs written by Huntingtons, except track 14 (Ritchie Valens).
 Alison's The Bomb
 Bubblegum Girl
 Lucy's About To Lose Her Mind
 The Only One
 Huntingtons At The Beach
 All She Knows (Is Breakin' My Heart)
 Losing Penny
 She's A Brat
 Friday Nights At The Rec
 Goddess And The Geek
 Don't Beat Me Up
 Crackhead
 Leave Home
 Come On Let's Go

Personnel
Mike Holt: Vocals/bass
Cliff Powell: Guitar/vocals
Mike Pierce: Drums
Brad Ber: Guitar/vocals

Additional musicians
Joe Queer - vocals on tracks 5 & 11, guitar solo on track 5
Dan Lumley - tambourine on track 4
Tommy Tantrum - additional rhythm guitar

Production
Produced by Mass Giorgini
Engineered by Mass Giorgini and Jeff Hansell
Second engineer/drum tech: Dan Lumley
Mixed, edited and sequenced by Mass Giorgini.
Mastered by Barry Quinn at Masterfonics

References

The Huntingtons albums
1997 albums